Katawar or Katir is the name for the northern mountainous regions of Kafirstan in  Afghanistan and Pakistan. The Black-Robed (Siah-Posh) tribes living in these regions are also known as Katawars or Katirs.

Other names for the tribes  are Kata, Kator and Katawer.

The Kafirs of Siah-Posh groups are descended from the ancient Kambojas.

See also
 Katirs
 Kamtoz
 Kam
 Kafirstan
 Nurestan
 Nuristani people
 Nuristani languages
 Katawar

Ethnic groups in Afghanistan
Ethnic groups in Pakistan